Jean-Claude Pennetier (born 16 May 1942) is a French classical pianist.

Biography 
Born in Châtellerault, Pennetier began studying the piano at the age of three and later entered the Conservatoire de Paris in piano and chamber music classes. After having passed several international competitions, he began a solo career which led him to perform abroad. In the early 1970s, he temporarily interrupted this career to devote himself to composition and conducting. He also took advantage of this period to deepen his repertoire and his reflection on music. He became interested in musical theatre, writing operas for children, the pianoforte. He is also passionate about chamber music and contemporary classical music. He conducts the Ensemble intercontemporain, the Ensemble 2e2m and from 1995, he teaches at the Conservatoire de Paris. He has premiered works by Philippe Hersant, Maurice Ohana, Pascal Dusapin, Nicolas Zourabichvili among other composers of the XX that he likes. He is currently invited in France and abroad as soloist with renowned orchestras: the Orchestre de Paris, Dresden Staatskapelle, NHK de Tokyo, etc. He regularly is the guest of the Festival de La Roque-d'Anthéron, that of Prades, Pyrénées-Orientales, the Chopin Festival at the Château de Bagatelle, the Summer Musical Season of  Sceaux, the Printemps des Arts of Monte-Carlo etc. He performs each season in Canada and the United States to play with orchestra, in recital or in a chamber ensemble.

Pennetier holds the ranks of Chevalier of the Légion d'honneur and Officier of the Ordre des Arts et des Lettres.

Finally, his spiritual journey led him, in 2004, to be ordained priest of the Orthodox Church (within the Romanian Orthodox metropolis of Western and Southern Europe). He is currently rector of the parish of Chartres.

He is Valérie Soudères's daughter "France" husband.

Prizes 
 1st Prizes for piano and chamber music at the Conservatoire.
 1er Prize Gabriel Fauré, 
 2e Prize Long-Thibaud-Crespin Competition
 1st Prize of the Concours de Montréal.
 1st nominated at the Geneva International Music Competition (1968)
 Lauréate of the Marguerite Long competition
 Grand Prix of the Académie Charles Cros in 1999 for Schubert's sonata in B flat major.

Selected recordings 
 Works by Brahms, Schumann, Debussy, Beethoven (Lyrinx); Schubert (sonata in B flat major)
 Ravel (chamber music), Saphir Productions
 Mozart, with Michel Portal and the Ysaÿe quartet, Aeon.(2006)
 Schubert's Trios, with Régis Pasquier and Roland Pidoux, Harmonia Mundi
 Hyacinthe Jadin's Sonatas for pianoforte (on a period instrument)
 Maurice Ohana's Concerto for piano and orchestra, orchestre philharmonique du Luxembourg, Arturo Tamayo, Timpani (1997)
 Maurice Ohana's 3 Caprices, 24 Préludes; Arion (1989)
 Gabriel Fauré's complete work for piano - vols. 1, 2, 3 and 4 ; Mirare 2009 -  2011 - 2015 - 2018. Diapason d'or.

References

External links 
 Pianiste et prêtre, les vocations de Jean-Claude Pennetier (France Info)
 Jean-Claude Pennetier (France Culture)
 Jean-Claude Pennetier (Radio Classique)
 Jean-Claude Pennetier (France Musique)

People from Châtellerault
1942 births
Living people
20th-century French male classical pianists
Conservatoire de Paris alumni
Academic staff of the Conservatoire de Paris
Chevaliers of the Légion d'honneur
Officiers of the Ordre des Arts et des Lettres
21st-century French male classical pianists